Ramenki may refer to:
Ramenki District, a district of Western Administrative Okrug of Moscow, Russia
Ramenki (rural locality), name of several rural localities in Russia
Ramenki (Moscow Metro), a station on the Kalininsko-Solntsevskaya Line of the Moscow Metro opened in 2017